Jogira Sara Ra Ra is an upcoming Indian Hindi-language romantic comedy film written by Ghalib Asad Bhopali and directed by Kushan Nandy and jointly produced by Kiran Shroff and Naeem Siddiqui. The film stars Nawazuddin Siddiqui and Neha Sharma, alongside Sanjay Mishra and Mahaakshay Chakraborty in supporting roles.

Cast 
 Nawazuddin Siddiqui as Ajay Khanna, Tanya’s husband 
 Neha Sharma as Tanya Khanna (née Gupta), Shankar’s daughter
 Sanjay Mishra as Shankar Gupta, Tanya’s father
 Mahaakshay Chakraborty as Rajeev

Production 
The principal photography began on 27 February 2021. The film was wrapped up on 7 April 2021.

References

External links 
 

Indian romantic comedy films
Upcoming films